2 Broke Girls (stylized 2 Broke Girl$) is an American television sitcom that aired on CBS from September 19, 2011, to April 17, 2017. The series was produced for Warner Bros. Television and created by Michael Patrick King and Whitney Cummings. Set in the Williamsburg neighborhood of Brooklyn, New York City, the show's plot follows the lives of friends Max Black (Kat Dennings) and Caroline Channing (Beth Behrs). Whereas Caroline was raised as the daughter of a billionaire, Max grew up in poverty, resulting in differing perspectives on life, although together they work in a local diner while attempting to raise funds to start a cupcake business.

The series has received a polarized response from critics and audiences alike. The on-screen chemistry between the show's six leads, especially that of Behrs and Dennings, has been praised, while others have criticized the show's reliance on sexualized, drug related, and racial humor. The series was nominated for 12 Emmy Awards in various categories over its run, winning an Emmy in 2012 for art direction. During the course of the series, 138 episodes of the show aired over six seasons.

On May 12, 2017, CBS cancelled the series after six seasons.

Synopsis

The series chronicles the lives of two waitresses in their mid-20s (at the start of the series): Max Black (Kat Dennings), the child of a poor working-class mother and an unknown father, and Caroline Channing (Beth Behrs), who was born rich but is now disgraced and penniless because her father, Martin Channing, got caught operating a Bernard Madoff-esque Ponzi scheme. The two work together at a Brooklyn diner, soon becoming roommates and friends while building toward their dream of one day opening a cupcake shop. Among those working with them at the restaurant are their boss, Han Lee (Matthew Moy); Oleg (Jonathan Kite), an upbeat but perverted and harassing Ukrainian cook; and Earl (Garrett Morris), a 75-year-old cashier. Also featured starting late in the first season is their neighbor and part-time boss Sophie (Jennifer Coolidge), a Polish immigrant who runs the house-cleaning company Sophie's Choice.

During most of the first season, Max is also a part-time nanny for the twin babies of Peach Landis (Brooke Lyons), who during the season adopts Caroline's horse Chestnut. At the end of each episode, a tally shows how much they have made toward their goal of $250,000. Early in the second season, Sophie lends the women $20,000, which is enough for them to start their business. However, the business fails, and in the 18th episode, they are forced to give up the lease of their cupcake shop with just enough money to pay off Sophie's loan, resetting the end of episode tally to $1. The shop opposite to theirs belonged to Andrew who had his own candy shop named Candy Andy. Andrew (Ryan Hansen) was Caroline's first major love interest, but they broke up because Caroline's major focus was her cupcake business and Andy "wanted more". 

During the third season, the two young women reopen the business in the back room of the diner, using the window as a walk-up window. Max also enrolls in, and Caroline goes to work for, the Manhattan School of Pastry, where Max finds a love interest, Deke, marking the first time in the series that Max gets emotional for a man after the second episode when she broke up with her then cheating boyfriend, Robbie. Caroline has a brief affair with the Pastry School Head Chef Nicholas, which eventually leads to Nicholas closing down the school and moving back to France with his wife. They also attempt to get Deke's parents to invest in the pastry school, planning to run it by themselves, but do not succeed.

During season four, the women finally start their cupcake business, which succeeds briefly before going into the red. Both Max and Caroline end up working in an elite-class pastry shop called "The High" to make more money to return the loan they took for their business. Max also had a brief fling with a new handsome waiter, Nashit, who later turned out to be under 18, when his mother arrived to bring him back to Ireland. In the end of season four, Oleg and Sophie get married, with the two realizing they have their own business to worry about and their own dream to work towards, which leads to them quitting "The High" and coming back to their business.

In season five, Caroline sells her life story to a film producer for $250,000. She uses most of the money to expand their old cupcake space into the adjacent pizza shop, converting it into a dessert bar. The remaining $30,000 is used to purchase part ownership of the diner to help Han pay off his debts from gambling on women's tennis. While in Hollywood with Caroline consulting on her life story script, Max meets her second major love interest in the series, a Los Angeles-based "lawyer to the stars" named Randy. Meanwhile, despite her advancing age, Sophie becomes pregnant with Oleg's child.

Season six has Sophie and Oleg welcoming their baby daughter Barbara to the world. Randy returns to briefly continue his relationship with Max, but it does not work out. Randy wants Max to move to California, but Max, publicly acknowledging her strong friendship with Caroline for the first time, says she cannot do so because she has important people in her life now. Meanwhile, Caroline meets Bobby, a contractor who rebuilds the dessert bar after a storm, and the two start a relationship. By the end of the season, the movie about Caroline's life has been made (albeit with some "creative license" changes), but Caroline destroys a $10,000 on-loan dress at the premiere, which wipes out both her and Max's combined savings and returns them to "broke" status. Randy comes back to New York, this time permanently, and proposes to Max, who accepts. The series ends at this point, as 2 Broke Girls was unexpectedly cancelled by the network without allowing the creative team to resolve the show's continuing plotlines.

Cast

Main
 Kat Dennings as Maxine "Max" George Black, one of the waitresses at the Williamsburg Diner. She is a poor working-class girl who had a rough childhood in Hope, Rhode Island, and an equally rough adult life, driven by both poverty and being raised by a mother who was usually absent and dangerously incompetent when she was around (it's strongly implied that her mother is a longtime drug addict). Han initially allowed her to sell homemade cupcakes in the diner, which led to her going forward with Caroline's idea to go into the cupcake business. Max is street-smart, tends to deliver insults with a smile, and often pokes fun at her own promiscuous behavior, voluptuous breasts, and marijuana indulgence. She always wears knee-high brown leather boots and a name tag while waitressing. She is co-godmothers with Caroline to Barbara Kaczyński-Golishevsky.
 Beth Behrs as Caroline Wesbox Channing, a waitress at the Williamsburg Diner. She is a skinny, blonde, formerly rich high-society girl and University of Pennsylvania Wharton graduate who lost all of her money when her father was arrested and thrown in jail for a Ponzi scheme. She is forced to start over and becomes Max's co-worker, roommate, and eventual best friend. She comes up with the idea of starting a cupcake business with Max. Despite being spoiled since birth and then losing her money, Caroline is kind and optimistic, though high-maintenance at times. She is sometimes very clueless. Caroline always wears large pearl necklaces with her waitress uniform, as well as high-heeled shoes and a metal, silver hook around her waist. Unlike Max, she does not wear a name tag with her waitress uniform. She is co-godmothers with Max to Barbara Kaczyński-Golishevesky.
 Garrett Morris as Earl Washington, the elderly cashier who has worked at the Williamsburg Diner since 1962, or 1989, and a former jazz musician with a love of marijuana and gambling. Max is very close to him, and frequently says that she wishes he was her father. By season six, Earl is starting to show signs of memory loss, but the show never explored the topic with any seriousness.
 Jonathan Kite as Vanko Oleg Golishevsky, a Ukrainian cook at the Williamsburg Diner. He sexually harasses Max and Caroline constantly with inappropriate jokes, innuendo, and propositions for sex, but his behavior is benign and easily ignored (or mocked, by Max). He later develops an attraction to Sophie, and has a purely sexual relationship with her. At the end of season two, Oleg cheated on Sophie, leading her to angrily break up with him off-screen before the third-season premiere. In season four, the two reconcile and get engaged and then married. In the sixth-season premiere, they have a baby daughter named Barbara Kaczyński-Golishevsky. 
 Matthew Moy as Han Margaret Lee, the owner of the Williamsburg Diner. He is constantly a target for jokes (mainly from Max) involving his height, his effeminate mannerisms in spite of his claims of being heterosexual, and his lack of knowledge of American culture. He is originally from South Korea and he references his parents and his home country often.
 Jennifer Coolidge as Zofia "Sophie" Kachinsky (recurring, season 1; regular, seasons 2–6), a loud-mouthed tall, blonde, buxom Polish woman who owns a cleaning company, lives in the apartment above the girls, and often regales them with stories about her sex life and growing up in Communist Poland. She prefers Max over Caroline but often calls Caroline "fluffy" due to her ditzy characteristic and despite multiple bad interactions with the two girls, Sophie still invests in their cupcake business in season two. She always sits in a booth that she considers her own. She was involved in a relationship with Oleg during seasons two and three, gets engaged to him in season four, marries him in the finale, and during season five becomes pregnant with their first child. In the sixth-season premiere, they have a baby girl that they name Barbara Kaczyński-Golishevsky.

Recurring
 Chestnut is Caroline's horse, one of the few possessions she was able to retain from her old life prior to her father's business scandal. During the first season, Chestnut lived full-time in the garden of Max's apartment, until Max convinced Caroline to have Peach adopt and stable him so that he could endure the winter weather. At the end of the season, Max goes back to Peach and gets him back. In season two, the girls enlist the help of two Amish boys to convert the garden into a barn as a permanent home for Chestnut. He appears in all seasons. He is portrayed by a horse named Rocky, who died in 2019 along with his sister Ruby.
 Brooke Lyons as Peach Landis (season 1), a high-society mother who acts like the most clueless version of that descriptive. She has two babies, Brad and Angelina (a reference to real-life actors Brad Pitt and Angelina Jolie), whom Max babysits. Peach fired Max from that job to appease an awful friend of hers after a cupcake-catering mishap, and after she begged Max to return full-time, Max decided that she would only return in a part-time capacity. She has not been seen or heard from since, and the show has made it clear Max no longer has any association with her.
 Nick Zano as Johnny (seasons 1–2), Max's on-again-off-again love interest. He told Max he broke up with Cashandra and that he was about to marry a woman he met just a few months earlier, in the season-one finale. He was not seen again until the season 2 episode "And the Big Opening," in which he and Max had sex. They both agreed that they only wanted each other when they were taken by another person. He left at the end of that episode, promising her he would see her again someday.
 Ryan Hansen as "Candy" Andy (seasons 2, 5, and 6), a candy-store owner whose business was across from the cupcake store, and Caroline's love interest in season two. In season five, Andy returns to Williamsburg and invites Caroline and Max to his wedding, where he marries Romy, a hat designer. The season-six episode "And the Rock Me on the Dais" reveals Andy divorced Romy, and is also quite wealthy.
 Federico Dordei as Luis (season 3), a flamboyant man who becomes the new day waiter in the season 3 episode "And the Group Head". He is attracted to Oleg.
 Gilles Marini as Nicolas Saintcroix (season 3), a French "master baker" who owns and teaches at the Manhattan School of Pastry; he was Caroline's love interest until she realized he is married in "And the French Kiss". His wife and he have an "open relationship" and his wife even gives Caroline permission to sleep with Nicolas, but Caroline refuses because she does not want to sleep with a married man. He later moves back to France to be with his wife, thus the Manhattan School of Pastry closes.
 Mary Lynn Rajskub as Bebe (season 3), a neurotic pastry chef who works at the front desk of the Manhattan School of Pastry. She later moves to Canada, claiming that "they" have found her. This is a joke aimed at her role as Chloe Brian in the espionage show 24, at the end her character has to go into hiding.
 Eric André as Deacon "Deke" Bromberg (season 3), a sarcastic half-black/half-Jewish student at the pastry school who quickly becomes Max's friend, lover, and later ex-boyfriend. He is the second person to whom Max says "I love you" (the first being Caroline). Despite living in a renovated dumpster, he is later revealed to be rich, his parents owning a large elevator company. However, when he contemplates making a stand against his parents after they objected to his relationship with Max, Max drugs him so Caroline and she can push his dumpster in front of his parents' house, Max knowing that Deke would be unable to cope with being genuinely poor. In "And the Wedding Cake Cake Cake", Max reveals that she and Deke are no longer together and admits she wishes things had worked out between them.
 Patrick Cox as John (seasons 3–4), a large, homosexual, bald man who shared a table in the pastry school classroom with Max, who nicknames him "Big Mary". They later worked together at The High.
 Sandra Bernhard as Joedth (pronounced "Joe") (season 4), the lesbian owner of The High, a boutique restaurant where Max and Caroline start working.
 Austin Falk as Nashit "Nash" (season 4), a handsome new waiter at The High, later hired by Han to be a dishwasher at the diner. He returns home to Ireland when his mother shows up to get him, also revealing that Nash is not yet 18.
 Ed Quinn as Randy Walsh (seasons 5–6), a lawyer who becomes Max's lover while the girls are in Hollywood to discuss the film adaptation of Caroline's life story. He later breaks up their relationship before she leaves town, saying that he likes her too much and knows how long-distance relationships usually end, but he then follows her to New York and they briefly continue the relationship. He returns at the end of season six to open a permanent office in New York, and proposes to Max. She accepts.
 Christopher Gorham as Bobby (season 6) is a contractor who helps rebuild the dessert bar after a storm, and soon becomes Caroline's love interest.
 Kerri Kenney as Denise (season 6), Bobby's older sister, who is very much a crazy woman with a romantic eye for Han.

Special guest stars

 Renée Taylor as Hinda Fagel
 Martha Stewart as herself
 Steven Weber as Martin Channing, Caroline's father, who is currently in prison for a Ponzi scheme he masterminded.
 Cedric the Entertainer as Darius, Earl's estranged son.
 Caroline Aaron as Wiga, a psychic whom Caroline visits for a reading about her future love life.
 2 Chainz as himself
 Andy Dick as J. Petto, a puppeteer who slips on a cupcake at Max and Caroline's cupcake shop, and tries to sue them over his damaged puppet. He returns in the season 6 premiere to thwart the girls' attempts to obtain a liquor license.
 Missi Pyle as Charity Channing, Caroline's rich and abusive aunt. She refused to give Max and Caroline a loan for their failing business, and later admitted that Caroline's claims to their parents that Charity was abusive to her (which they did not believe) were accurate.
 Debra Wilson as Delores, an exhausted employee at the temporary agency where Max and Caroline worked. Her catchphrase, "Let me give you a 'for instance'", was used throughout the episode to illustrate violations to company policies.
 Kym Whitley as Shirley
 Piers Morgan as himself
 Kyle Gass as an SFX operator
 Karen Maruyama as Su-Min Lee, Han's mother, who initially appears as a lame strict stereotype of an "Asian mom", but turns out to be a pro-marijuana woman who loves and even admires her son's decision to leave Korea for America.
 Jeff Garlin as David, Deke's father
 Sheryl Lee Ralph as Genet, Deke's mother
 Lindsay Lohan as Claire Guinness, a soon-to-be-bride who asks Max and Caroline to make her wedding cake but constantly changes her mind about the cakes and every other thing she has to make decisions about, leading to Max and Caroline having to successfully scam their promised payment from her.
 Hal Linden as Lester. Lester is the real named tenant of Max and Caroline's apartment, whose OK is needed for them to (illegally) remain there. He goes from telling them they can stay since he's going to move in with his girlfriend, then becoming their unwanted roommate after said GF dumps him, then saying he'll evict them unless Max sleeps with him, to finally being conned into letting them re-up on a new legal 10-year lease to the apartment.
 Kim Kardashian as herself
 Jesse Metcalfe as Sebastian, Max's brief fling. He works as a DJ at a grocery chain and Max cannot get over how embarrassing his job is.
 Valerie Harper as Nola Anderz, a regular customer at the diner who is actually a successful photographer.
 Ellie Reed as Claire
 Caroline Rhea as Bonnie, a randy flight attendant at the airport where the second branch of The High is located.
 Martha Hunt as herself, one of several Victoria's Secret models who stay at Max and Caroline's ahead of a big VS event in Brooklyn.
 Lily Aldridge as herself
 Judith Roberts as Astrid, Caroline's grandmother who awakens from a coma with no knowledge of her family's massive money scandal.
 Jackée Harry as Ruby, a jazz singer-turned-night club owner who was once involved with Earl until his drug habit drove her away.
 George Hamilton as Bob
 Darin Brooks as Frank, Bobby's bowling team-mate
 John Michael Higgins as Elliot, Randy's therapist
 Noah Mills as Robbie, Max's womanizing, alcoholic lover
 Mercedes Ruehl as Olga, Oleg's Ukrainian mother
 Telma Hopkins as Pilar
 French Stewart as Mr. Bronsk.
 Chad Michaels as a Cher impersonator
 RuPaul as himself (out of drag)
 Brandon Jones as Jebediah, an Amish man building Chestnut's barn
 Nora Dunn as Teresa, Bobby's overbearing and possessive mother.
 Annet Mahendru as Robin
 Marsha Thomason as Cashandra, Johnny's love interest

Production

Development and casting
Even before it went to series, the then-undeveloped pilot was the subject of a bidding war, with CBS landing the deal on December 10, 2010, and ordering it to series on May 13, 2011. It was one of two shows commissioned for the 2011–12 television season for which Whitney Cummings served as producer and co-creator, the other being Whitney, which was picked up by NBC, but was cancelled after two seasons.

Dennings was the first to be cast in the role of Max on February 18, 2011. A week later on February 25, 2011, Behrs won an audition to land the role of Caroline, beating out other established actresses. Moy, Morris and Kite were the last three to be cast on March 16, 2011.

Filming
The series was taped in front of a live studio audience.

Timeslot change
The first episode aired at 9:30 pm (E/P) after Two and a Half Men on September 19, 2011, and the show moved to its regular timeslot following How I Met Your Mother on Monday nights at 8:30 pm (E/P). Production for the second season began on August 6, 2012.

For its second season 2 Broke Girls moved to 9 pm ET/PT after Two and a Half Men was moved to Thursdays, and remained there until early in its third season.

On March 27, 2013, CBS renewed 2 Broke Girls for a third season. The show was first moved back to its original timeslot, which opened when We Are Men was cancelled, and stayed there until March 24, 2014. Beginning on April 7, 2014, 2 Broke Girls moved to 8 pm to replace How I Met Your Mother following its conclusion, with the show's former timeslot given to the short-lived Friends with Better Lives.

On March 13, 2014, CBS renewed 2 Broke Girls for a fourth season. The network announced a premiere date of October 27, 2014. The move was prompted by CBS' arrangement to air Thursday Night Football for the first few weeks of the season and their subsequent decision not to postpone the season premiere of The Big Bang Theory, which occupied 2 Broke Girls' timeslot until October 20, and then returned to its normal Thursday timeslot. The fourth season consisted of 22 episodes.

On March 12, 2015, CBS renewed 2 Broke Girls for a fifth season, which premiered Thursday, November 12, 2015. CBS moved the show to Thursdays 9:30 pm ET/PT due to Supergirl taking over its previous Monday night timeslot. 2 Broke Girls had its premiere delayed again this season due to CBS airing Thursday Night Football for the season's several weeks initially. By November, regular Thursday programming resumed with The Big Bang Theory and new comedy Life in Pieces moving to Thursdays after airing on Monday nights at the beginning of the season. Mom and 2 Broke Girls then premiered the same month to form CBS' Thursday night comedy block. By midseason, CBS moved 2 Broke Girls to Wednesdays 8 pm ET/PT starting January 6, 2016, pairing it with the final season of Mike and Molly. Both comedies were slated to air for six weeks on the Wednesday 8–9 hour before going on an indefinite hiatus due to Survivor returning to that timeslot the following month. However, on February 8, 2016, CBS cancelled new comedy Angel from Hell with 2 Broke Girls replacing it and returning to its Thursday timeslot on February 18, 2016.

Cancellation 
The series was canceled after six seasons on May 12, 2017. A combination of factors, including declining ratings, CBS's desire to have an ownership stake, and the network needing to clear space for three new sitcoms in the fall 2017 schedule, led to the show's demise. Because the cancellation news happened once Season 6 had wrapped with producers and cast not given indication on the show's status before then, the Season 6 finale does not serve as any kind of de facto series finale in terms of the characters or major plotlines. There are no plans as of 2022 to have any reunion movie or other special show that would become a more "final" finale for the series.

Episodes

Broadcast
2 Broke Girls is aired in numerous countries around the world. In Canada the series airs on Citytv. In the United Kingdom, 2 Broke Girls airs on E4. In the Republic of Ireland, it airs on RTÉ2. In India, it airs on Star World, Comedy Central & Colors Infinity. In the Philippines, "2 Broke Girls" airs on ETC In Australia, the show airs on 10 Peach In New Zealand, it airs on TV2.

Reception

2 Broke Girls received mixed reviews from critics. On Rotten Tomatoes the first season holds a rating of 59%, based on 34 reviews, with an average rating of 6.4/10. The site's critical consensus reads, "Kat Dennings and Beth Behrs have undeniable chemistry, and although 2 Broke Girls is at times bogged down by predictable jokes, this old-fashioned odd couple sitcom is rich with laughs." On Metacritic, the first season has a score of 66 out of 100, based on 25 critics, indicating "generally favorable reviews".

Much of the show's criticism focused on the perceived overuse of sexually-based jokes and offensive racial stereotypes. Tim Goodman of The Hollywood Reporter said that the show had potential, but "squandered it away every week on cheap, predictable and unfunny jokes", and noted that many jokes were of a racist or sexual nature. New Zealand critic Chris Philpott was especially offended by the series' rape jokes in the first three episodes, calling the series the worst new show of 2012 and stating that it "display[ed] a lack of understanding and creativity on the part of the comedy writer." Andrew Ti, writing for Grantland.com, singled out Han Lee's portrayal as "a fairly regressive portrayal" of the stereotypical Asian male—"a tiny, greedy, sexless man-child with infantilized speech patterns." Elliot B. Gertel at Jewish World Review similarly found an episode of the show misrepresented Orthodox Jews. When asked about the racial stereotypes at a January 2012 press conference, Michael Patrick King said, "I don't find it offensive, any of this".

Emily Nussbaum of The New Yorker wrote that while the way the supporting characters are written is "so racist it is less offensive than baffling", she noted that the show has "so much potential", and compared it favorably to Cummings' other show Whitney. Positive reviews such as one from Entertainment Weekly focused on the "potential" that the series has based on the acting and chemistry between Dennings and Behrs. The series also received a B+ from The Boston Globe TV critic Matthew Gilbert, who was impressed with the casting and production: "The actresses – especially the Gwen Stefani-esque Dennings – transcend their types, and the pop-savvy humor has spirit thanks to producer Michael Patrick King from Sex and the City. After the forced opening minutes, it's the best multi-cam-com of the season." Writing weekly reviews of the series, The A.V. Club editor Emily VanDerWerff hoped that the series would improve but ultimately wrote: "Most of the problems—weird story construction, stereotypical characters, bad jokes—that have bedeviled the show have been there from the very beginning, though I will certainly say they've gotten worse as the season has gone along and the show hasn't bothered to diversify its rhythms at all."

In 2015, Rob Owen of the Pittsburgh Post-Gazette said what started out as "a modern Laverne & Shirley" attracted many young people to begin with, until they "realized it was a waste of their time."

The show appeared on many critics' "Worst of The Year" lists throughout its run.

Ratings
The series premiere was watched by 19.4 million viewers after its lead-in, the first episode of Two and a Half Men without Charlie Sheen. This marked the highest rating for a fall premiere of a comedy series since Fall 2001. It scored a 7.1 rating in Adults 18–49. With DVR viewers included, the premiere rose to over 21.5 million viewers and an 8.1 in adults 18–49. The show has done well in ratings with college students and young males.

Awards and nominations

Syndication
On June 20, 2012, it was announced that TBS had secured the cable syndication rights to the sitcom, which began airing on September 20, 2015. The series has also been cleared on CBS and Weigel owned affiliates in 35% of the United States.

Home media
2 Broke Girls first became available on DVD in 2012 with the first season via Warner Bros. Home Entertainment, and was the only season to receive an additional Blu-ray release in countries United States, Canada and Australia. Subsequent seasons have received only a DVD release.

Multiple DVD sets received releases in the United Kingdom and Australia, with the first three-season being made available in 2014. Two subsequent sets containing seasons one to four and seasons one to five were released exclusively only in Australia.

References

External links

 
 
 2 Broke Girls at TV by the Numbers

2010s American sitcoms
2010s American workplace comedy television series
2011 American television series debuts
2017 American television series endings
Brooklyn in fiction
CBS original programming
English-language television shows
Fictional duos
Poverty in television
Television duos
Television series by Warner Bros. Television Studios
Television series created by Michael Patrick King
Television series created by Whitney Cummings
Television series set in restaurants
Television shows filmed in Los Angeles
Television shows set in Brooklyn